The Maiden Tower is an architectural monument, located on Diridag Mount in the Jabrayil region of the Azerbaijan Republic. 

 
Towers in Azerbaijan